Paulding is an unincorporated community in Ontonagon County in the U.S. state of Michigan. The Paulding Light, part of the area's folklore, is visible in a valley near Paulding.

History
A post office called Paulding was established in 1893, and remained in operation until it was discontinued in 1971. The community was named for John Paulding, a militiaman in the American Revolution.

References

Unincorporated communities in Ontonagon County, Michigan
Unincorporated communities in Michigan